Rodgers Creek is a rural locality in the Southern Downs Region, Queensland, Australia.

History 
The origin of the name is unclear. One story is that it is named after stockman James "Cocky" Rogers; another is that it is named after a boundary rider called Rodgers.

References 

Southern Downs Region
Localities in Queensland